In mathematics, a locally constant function is a function from a topological space into a set with the property that around every point of its domain, there exists some neighborhood of that point on which it restricts to a constant function.

Definition 

Let  be a function from a topological space  into a set  
The function  is called locally constant if it is locally constant at every point  in its domain.

Examples 

Every constant function is locally constant. The converse will hold if its domain is a connected space.  

If  is locally constant, then it is constant on any connected component of  The converse is true for locally connected spaces, which are spaces whose connected components are open subsets.

Further examples include the following:
 A map from a topological space  to a discrete space  is continuous if and only if it is locally constant.

Connection with sheaf theory 

The typical sheaf of course is not constant in this way; but the construction is useful in linking up sheaf cohomology with homology theory, and in logical applications of sheaves. The idea of local coefficient system is that we can have a theory of sheaves that  look like such 'harmless' sheaves (near any ), but from a global point of view exhibit some 'twisting'.

See also 

 

Sheaf theory